Chinnawat Wongchai (born 8 December 1996) is a Thai professional footballer who plays as a centre back for Thai League 1 club PT Prachuap, on loan from Buriram United.

References

External links

1996 births
Living people
Chinnawat Wongchai
Chinnawat Wongchai
Association football defenders
Chinnawat Wongchai
Chinnawat Wongchai
Chinnawat Wongchai